The British Universities Karting Championship (BUKC) is an annual University-based kart racing competition in the United Kingdom.

History
The BUKC, originally called the Inter Universities Karting Championship (IUKC), was formed in 2001 by students Will Tew and Tom Batho from Imperial College London. Prior to 2001 the IUKC was organised by students from Cardiff University and then the University of Nottingham and ran using 4-stroke variety karts. This all changed for the 2001/02 season with the beginning of an association with Club100, who supply a fleet of arrive-and-drive two-stroke TKM karts.

The IUKC 2001/02 became the first ever university karting championship to be run on 2-stroke machinery and was contested by 32 teams, over 4 rounds. It was won by Loughborough University.

In 2003, the format was altered, with a fifth round added; and the championship renamed to the British Universities Karting Championship. In order to keep the organisation consistent and the relationship with partners Club100 strong, 3T Racing Ltd was founded by Batho and Tew in 2003 as an independent governing body for the championship.

In 2018 the BUKC will be contested by 52 teams from universities across the United Kingdom over 8 rounds, with another 48 competing in the Rookies Championship.

Format
The BUKC uses a unique format that uses teams of 4 drivers, and takes place over a number of rounds during the academic year at many top class karting venues throughout the UK. Two different formats are used in the BUKC:

The Sprint Format

The Sprint Format is where every driver in the team gets to race in their own individual 25-minute race. No fuel stops, no driver changes. Just a 25-minute sprint to the flag. The teams finishing score for the round is determined by adding up the best 3 results from the 4 sprint races.

The Endurance Format

The Endurance Format is where the team (of 4 drivers) is split into two teams of 2. Each mini-team of 2 drivers races in a one-hour race. 2 fuel stops must be made, and at least one driver change must be made. The teams finishing score for the round is determined by adding up the points from both the 2 one-hour races.

Karts
The BUKC are supplied with Club100 karts for the championship. These are Birel N35 chassis, powered by Rotax 125cc (as of 2019) 2-stroke engines that are capable of speeds in excess of 70 mph. The karts use Vega RH8 Slicks in all weather, due to the logistical challenges presented with changing an entire fleet in a short period of time.

Universities taking part
The championship is open to teams from any UK institution of higher education. Each university may be represented by more than one team of four drivers; Loughborough University fielded three teams in 2008, with many universities following suit (Sheffield University attempted to qualify 5 teams for the 2015 season).

Oxford Brookes is the most successful team in the championship's history, with 6 titles to their name. The series is most popular among universities in the south of England; however, Wales is well represented, with Cardiff University and Swansea University taking part, and the University of Wales Trinity Saint David (formerly Swansea Metropolitan) came 2nd overall in 2009.

In 2009 Edinburgh became the first Scottish team to take part in the championships, with Heriot-Watt following in 2010. For the 2015 season, the University of the West of Scotland is the third Scottish University to take part, successfully qualifying for the main championship.

In 2014, the Dublin Institute of Technology became the first Irish university to race in the BUKC, taking part in the annual 24-hour race that closes out the end of every season in June, although it is not an official round of the championship.

In 2022, Oxford Brookes became the first university to ever qualify 6 teams for the mains championship, with 5 of the teams qualifying for the premier class.

A full list of competing universities can be found on the official BUKC website.

Champions

Drivers Championship

Further reading
"The British University Karting Championship." Karting1.co.uk Accessed January 2012.
 "About the British Universities Karting Championship" Kartingmagazine.co.uk Accessed February 2014.

References

External links
 Official website

Kart racing events
Sport in the United Kingdom